Kravjek may refer to multiple places in Slovenia: 

Kravjek Castle, a ruined castle northwest of Muljava, in Lower Carniola
Spodnji Jernej, a village in the Municipality of Slovenske Konjice, named Kravjek until 1999